Samuel Mozart Edoung-Biyo (born 24 November 1991) is a Cameroonian footballer who currently plays for Maryland Bobcats FC in the National Independent Soccer Association.

Career
Edoung-Biyo played college soccer at the University of the South between 2009 and 2012.

Edoung-Biyo signed with United Soccer League side Rochester Rhinos on 29 April 2017 after attending open tryouts for the club.

References

External links

1991 births
Living people
Cameroonian footballers
Cameroonian expatriate footballers
Rochester New York FC players
Association football defenders
Expatriate soccer players in the United States
USL Championship players
Soccer players from Washington, D.C.
Sewanee Tigers men's soccer players
Footballers from Douala
Maryland Bobcats FC players